Simon Harris may refer to:
 Simon Harris (musician) (born 1962), English electronic music producer and DJ
 Simon Harris (politician) (born 1986), Irish Fine Gael minister

See also
 Simon Harrison (born 1969), British racing driver